Hico Independent School District is a public school district based in Hico, Texas (USA).

Located in Hamilton County, portions of the district extend into Bosque, Comanche, and Erath counties.

In 2009, the school district was rated "recognized" by the Texas Education Agency.

History

Leon C. Murdoch was to become the superintendent effective July 1, 1983.

Schools
Hico High (Grades 9-12)
Hico Junior High (Grades 6-8)
Hico Elementary (Grades PK-5)

References

External links
Hico ISD

School districts in Hamilton County, Texas
School districts in Bosque County, Texas
School districts in Comanche County, Texas
School districts in Erath County, Texas